Électre (Electra) is an opera by the French composer Jean-Baptiste Lemoyne, first performed at the Académie Royale de Musique (the Paris Opéra) on 2 July 1782. It takes the form of a tragédie lyrique in three acts. The libretto, by Nicolas-François Guillard, is based on the Greek myth of Electra.

Roles

Notes

Sources
 Original libretto: Electre,//Tragédie//en 3 actes,//Représentée//Pour la première fois,//Par l'Académie-royale//de musique,//Le Mardi 2 Juillet 1782, Paris, De Lormel, 1782, via Gallica – BNF 
 Original printed score: Electre//Tragédie,//en Trois Actes,//Mise en Musique et Dediée//à la Reine//par Mr. Le Moyne, Paris, Chez l'auteur, 1782, via Gallica – BNF
 Félix Clément and Pierre Larousse, Dictionnaire des Opéras, p. 245. 
, "Foreigners at the Académie Royale de Musique" in Antonio Sacchini, Renaud, Madrid, Ediciones Singulares, 2013 (book accompanying the complete recording conducted by Christophe Rousset). 

Operas
French-language operas
Operas by Jean-Baptiste Lemoyne
Operas based on classical mythology
1782 operas
Tragédies en musique
Libretti by Nicolas-François Guillard